Glycogen storage disease type V (GSD5, GSD-V), also known as McArdle's disease, is a metabolic disorder, one of the metabolic myopathies, more specifically a muscle glycogen storage disease, caused by a deficiency of myophosphorylase. Its incidence is reported as one in 100,000,roughly the same as glycogen storage disease type I.

The disease was first reported in 1951 by Dr. Brian McArdle of Guy's Hospital, London.

Signs and symptoms

Onset symptoms 
The onset of this disease is usually noticed in childhood, but often not diagnosed until the third or fourth decade of life. Symptoms include exercise intolerance with muscle pain, early fatigue, painful cramps, inappropriate rapid heart rate response to exercise, and may include myoglobin in the urine (often provoked by a bout of exercise).  "In McArdle's, our heart rate tends to increase in what is called an 'inappropriate' response. That is, after the start of exercise it increases much more quickly than would be expected in someone unaffected by McArdle's." Myoglobinuria may be seen due to the breakdown of skeletal muscle known as rhabdomyolysis, a condition in which muscle cells breakdown, sending their contents into the bloodstream. In a recent study of 269 GSD-V patients, 39.4% reported no previous episodes of myoglobinuria and 6.8% had normal CK even with fixed muscle weakness, so an absence of myoglobinuria and normal CK should not rule out the possibility of the disease. 

Younger people may display unusual symptoms, such as difficulty in chewing, swallowing or utilizing normal oral motor functions. A number of comorbidities were found in GSD-V patients at a higher rate than found in the general population, including (but not limited to): hypertension (17%), endocrine diseases (15.7%), muskuloskeletal/rheumatic disease (12.9%), hyperuricemia/gout (11.6%), gastrointestinal diseases (11.2%), neurological disease (10%), respiratory disease (9.5%), and coronary artery disease (8.3%). Patients may have hypertrophy, particularly of the legs, and may have lower bone mineral content and density in the legs.

As skeletal muscle relies predominantly on glycogenolysis for the first few minutes as it transitions from rest to activity, as well as throughout high-intensity aerobic activity and all anaerobic activity, individuals with GSD-V experience during exercise: sinus tachycardia, tachypnea, muscle fatigue and pain, during the aforementioned activities and time frames. Patients may exhibit a “second wind” phenomenon. This is characterized by the patient's better tolerance for aerobic exercise such as walking and cycling after approximately 10 minutes.  This is attributed to the combination of increased blood flow and the ability of the body to find alternative sources of energy, like fatty acids and proteins. In the long term, patients may exhibit kidney failure due to the myoglobinuria, and with age, patients may exhibit progressively increasing weakness and substantial muscle loss.

GSD-V patients may experience myogenic hyperuricemia (exercise-induced accelerated breakdown of purine nucleotides in skeletal muscle). The Purine Nucleotide Cycle (PNC) is activated when the ATP (energy) reservoir in muscle cells runs low, and is a part of Protein Metabolism. In the Purine Nucleotide Cycle, three nucleotides: AMP (adenosine monophosphate), IMP (inosine monophosphate), and S-AMP (adenylosuccinate) are converted in a circular fashion; the byproducts are fumarate (which goes on to produce ATP via oxidative phosphorylation), ammonia (from the conversion of AMP into IMP), and uric acid (from excess IMP).  

Although the Purine Nucleotide Cycle produces AMP along with fumarate, AMP is primarily produced from the myokinase (adenylate kinase) reaction, which also runs when the ATP reservoir is low. The myokinase reaction is one of three reactions in the phosphagen system (ATP-PCr), with the myokinase reaction occurring after phosphocreatine (creatine phosphate) has been depleted. "...As a result of reduced glycolytic flux, there is frequently a mismatch between ATP consumption and production in the muscles of these patients. Thus, two ADP molecules can combine to regenerate ATP by the myokinase pathway in an attempt to keep up with ATP demand. In this reaction, AMP is produced."  

To avoid health complications, GSD-V patients need to get their ATP (energy) primarily from Free Fatty Acids (Lipid Metabolism) rather than Protein Metabolism.  Over-reliance on protein metabolism can be best avoided by not depleting the ATP reservoir, such as by not pushing through the pain and by not going too fast, too soon. "Be wary of pushing on when you feel pain start. This pain is a result of damaging muscles, and repeated damage will cause problems in the long term. But also this is counterproductive--it will stop you from getting into second wind. By pressing on despite the pain, you start your protein metabolism which then effectively blocks your glucose and fat metabolism. If you ever get into this situation, you need to stop completely for 30 minutes or more and then start the whole process again."

Patients may present at emergency rooms with severe fixed contractures of the muscles and often severe pain. These require urgent assessment for rhabdomyolysis as in about 30% of cases this leads to acute kidney injury. Left untreated, this can be life-threatening. In a small number of cases compartment syndrome has developed, requiring prompt surgical referral.

Genetics

"GSDV is inherited in an autosomal recessive manner. At conception, each sibling of an affected individual has a 25% chance of being affected, a 50% chance of being a carrier, and a 25% chance of being unaffected and not a carrier."

Two autosomal recessive forms of this disease occur, childhood-onset and adult-onset. The gene for myophosphorylase, PYGM (the muscle-type of the glycogen phosphorylase gene), is located on chromosome 11q13. According to the most recent publications, 95 different mutations have been reported.  The forms of the mutations may vary between ethnic groups. For example, the R50X (Arg50Stop) mutation (previously referred to as R49X) is most common in North America and western Europe, and the Y84X mutation is most common among central Europeans.

The exact method of protein disruption has been elucidated in certain mutations. For example, R138W is known to disrupt to pyridoxal phosphate binding site. In 2006, another mutation (c.13_14delCT) was discovered which may contribute to increased symptoms in addition to the common Arg50Stop mutation.

Myophosphorylase

Structure

The myophosphorylase structure consists of 842 amino acids. Its molecular weight of the unprocessed precursor is 97 kDa. The three-dimensional structure has been determined for this protein. The interactions of several amino acids in myophosphorylase's structure are known. Ser-14 is modified by phosphorylase kinase during activation of the enzyme. Lys-680 is involved in binding the pyridoxal phosphate, which is the active form of vitamin B6, a cofactor required by myophosphorylase. By similarity, other sites have been estimated: Tyr-76 binds AMP, Cys-109 and Cys-143 are involved in subunit association, and Tyr-156 may be involved in allosteric control.

Function

Myophosphorylase is the form of the glycogen phosphorylase found in muscle that catalyses the following reaction:

((1→4)-alpha-D-glucosyl) (n) + phosphate = ((1→4)-alpha-D-glucosyl) (n-1) + alpha-D-glucose 1-phosphate

Failure of this enzyme ultimately impairs the operation of ATPases. This is due to the lack of normal pH fall during exercise, which impairs the creatine kinase equilibrium and exaggerates the rise of ADP.

Pathophysiology

Myophosphorylase is involved in the breakdown of glycogen to glucose for use in muscle. The enzyme removes 1,4 glycosyl residues from outer branches of glycogen and adds inorganic phosphate to form glucose-1-phosphate. Ordinarily, the removal of 1,4 glycosyl residues by myophosphorylase leads to the formation of glucose-1-phosphate during glycogen breakdown and the polar, phosphorylated glucose cannot leave the cell membrane and so is marked for intracellular catabolism. In McArdle's Disease, deficiency of myophosphorylase leads to accumulation of intramuscular glycogen and a lack of glucose-1-phosphate for cellular fuel.

Myophosphorylase exists in the active form when phosphorylated. The enzyme phosphorylase kinase plays a role in phosphorylating glycogen phosphorylase to activate it and another enzyme, protein phosphatase-1, inactivates glycogen phosphorylase through dephosphorylation.

Diagnosis
There are some laboratory tests that may aid in diagnosis of GSD-V. A muscle biopsy will note the absence of myophosphorylase in muscle fibers. In some cases, acid-Schiff stained glycogen can be seen with microscopy.

Genetic sequencing of the PYGM gene (which codes for the muscle isoform of glycogen phosphorylase) may be done to determine the presence of gene mutations, determining if McArdle's is present. This type of testing is considerably less invasive than a muscle biopsy.

The physician can also perform an ischemic forearm exercise test as described above. Some findings suggest a nonischemic test could be performed with similar results. The nonischemic version of this test would involve not cutting off the blood flow to the exercising arm. Findings consistent with McArdle's disease would include a failure of lactate to rise in venous blood and exaggerated ammonia levels. These findings would indicate a severe muscle glycolytic block.

Serum lactate may fail to rise in part because of increased uptake via the monocarboxylate transporter (MCT1), which is upregulated in skeletal muscle in McArdle disease. Lactate may be used as a fuel source once converted to pyruvate. Ammonia levels may rise given ammonia is a by-product of the adenylate kinase pathway, an alternative pathway for ATP production. In this pathway, two ADP molecules combine to make ATP; AMP is deaminated in this process, producing inosine monophosphate (IMP) and ammonia (NH3).

Physicians may also check resting levels of creatine kinase, which are moderately increased in 90% of patients. In some, the level is increased by multitudes - a person without GSD-V will have a CK between 60 and 400IU/L, while a person with the syndrome may have a level of 5,000 IU/L at rest, and may increase to 35,000 IU/L or more with muscle exertion. This can help distinguish McArdle's syndrome from carnitine palmitoyltransferase II deficiency (CPT-II), a lipid-based metabolic disorder which prevents fatty acids from being transported into mitochondria for use as an energy source. Also, serum electrolytes and endocrine studies (such as thyroid function, parathyroid function and growth hormone levels) will also be completed. Urine studies are required only if rhabdomyolysis is suspected. Urine volume, urine sediment and myoglobin levels would be ascertained. If rhabdomyolysis is suspected, serum myoglobin, creatine kinase, lactate dehydrogenase, electrolytes and renal function will be checked.

Physicians may also conduct an Exercise Stress Test to test for an inappropriate rapid heart rate (Sinus Tachycardia) in response to exercise. Due to the rare nature of the disease, the inappropriate rapid heart rate in response to exercise may be misdiagnosed as Inappropriate Sinus Tachycardia (which is a diagnosis of exclusion). The 12 Minute Walk Test (12MWT) can be used to determine "Second Wind," which requires a treadmill (no incline), heart rate monitor, stop watch, pain scale, and that the patient has rested for 30 minutes prior to the test to ensure that oxidative phosphorylation has stopped.

Treatment
Supervised exercise programs have been shown in small studies to improve exercise capacity by several measures.

Oral sucrose treatment (for example a sports drink with 75 grams of sucrose in 660 ml.) taken 30 minutes prior to exercise has been shown to help improve exercise tolerance including a lower heart rate and lower perceived level of exertion compared with placebo.

A low dosage treatment with creatine showed a significant improvement of muscle problems compared to placebo in a small clinical study.

History

The deficiency was the first metabolic myopathy to be recognized, when Dr. McArdle described the first case in a 30-year-old man who always experienced pain and weakness after exercise. Dr. McArdle noticed this patient's cramps were electrically silent and his venous lactate levels failed to increase upon ischemic exercise. (The ischemic exercise consists of the patient squeezing a hand dynamometer at maximal strength for a specific period of time, usually a minute, with a blood pressure cuff, which is placed on the upper arm and set at 250 mmHg, blocking blood flow to the exercising arm.) Notably, this is the same phenomenon that occurs when muscle is poisoned by iodoacetate, a substance that blocks breakdown of glycogen into glucose and prevents the formation of lactate. Dr. McArdle accurately concluded that the patient had a disorder of glycogen breakdown that specifically affected skeletal muscle. The associated enzyme deficiency was discovered in 1959 by W. F. H. M. Mommaerts et al.

References

External links

 Euromac, an EU-funded consortium of medical and research institutes across Europe which is building a patient registry and raising standards of care for people with McArdle Disease.
 International Association for Muscle Glycogen Storage Disease (IamGSD).
 Walking With McArdle's - IAMGSD videos
 EUROMAC Introduction - Video about McArdle Disease and the EUROMAC Registry of McArdle Disease and other rare glycogenoses patients

Autosomal recessive disorders
Inborn errors of carbohydrate metabolism